The Serie B 1983–84 was the fifty-second tournament of this competition played in Italy since its creation.

Teams
Triestina, Padova, Empoli and Pescara had been promoted from Serie C, while Cagliari, Cesena and Catanzaro had been relegated from Serie A.

Final classification

Results

References and sources
Almanacco Illustrato del Calcio - La Storia 1898-2004, Panini Edizioni, Modena, September 2005

Serie B seasons
2
Italy